John Williamson Pentland is a former Scottish Labour Party politician.  He was the Member of the Scottish Parliament (MSP) for the Motherwell and Wishaw constituency from 2011 to 2016.

Pentland worked as a welder with Butters Brothers, Craigneuk and then spent 28 years with British Steel Corporation at the Clyde Alloy plant. He has been a member of the Labour Party for over 30 years, holding numerous branch and CLP positions. He was elected to the former Motherwell District Council in 1992, and served on Planning, Leisure Services, Environmental Health, Staffing, and Policy and Resources Committees. Prior to his election as an MSP, he was Convener of North Lanarkshire Council Finance Committee, he was also finance spokesperson for the Convention of Scottish Local Authorities from 2002 till 2007.

John Pentland was elected to the Scottish Parliament in the election of 5 May 2011.

References

External links
 
johnpentland.org John Pentland (personal website)

Year of birth missing (living people)
Living people
People from Motherwell
Scottish Labour councillors
Labour MSPs
Members of the Scottish Parliament 2011–2016